Roscoe is a city in Nolan County in the U.S. state of Texas near the intersection of Interstate 20 and US Highway 84.  The Union Pacific Railroad passes through the center of the city.

Geography

Roscoe is located at  (32.4459520, –100.5387184).

The population was 1,378 at the 2000 census, but has since decreased to only about 900.Need Citation, Disagrees with Side Bar - History

Climate

According to the Köppen climate classification system, Roscoe has a semiarid climate, BSk on climate maps.

Demographics

2020 census

As of the 2020 United States census, there were 1,271 people, 565 households, and 450 families residing in the city.

2000 census
As of the census of 2000, 1,380 people, 509 households, and 382 families resided in the city. The population density was 728.1 people per square mile (281.5/km). The 588 housing units averaged 310.7/sq mi (120.1/km). The racial makeup of the city were 75.18% White, 1.09% African American, 0.44% Native American, 0.15% Asian, 20.17% from other races, and 2.98% from two or more races. Hispanics or Latinos of any race were 36.94% of the population.

Of 509 households, 32.6% had children under the age of 18 living with them, 61.5% were married couples living together, 10.2% had a female householder with no husband present, and 24.8% were not families. About 22.8% of all households were made up of individuals, and 13.0% had someone living alone who was 65 years of age or older. The average household size was 2.63 and the average family size was 3.09.

In the town, the population was distributed as 28.2% under the age of 18, 6.9% from 18 to 24, 23.3% from 25 to 44, 22.3% from 45 to 64, and 19.3% who were 65 years of age or older. The median age was 38 years. For every 100 females, there were 89.8 males. For every 100 females age 18 and over, there were 90.6 males.

The median income for a household in the city was $23,816, and for a family was $28,393. Males had a median income of $25,313 versus $20,000 for females. The per capita income for the city was $11,792. About 20.6% of families and 25.2% of the population were below the poverty line, including 34.9% of those under age 18 and 17.1% of those age 65 or over.

Wind energy 

The Roscoe Wind Farm, owned and operated by E.ON Climate and Renewables, is one of the world's largest capacity wind farms with 627 wind turbines and a total installed capacity of 781.5 MW. At the time of its completion, it was the largest wind farm in the world, surpassing the nearby 735.5-MW Horse Hollow Wind Energy Center. In 2012, it was overtaken by California's 1,020-MW Alta Wind Energy Center. The project cost more than $1 billion and provides enough power for more than 250,000 average Texan homes. A landowner can earn between $500 and $1,000 per windmill per year.

Education
The City of Roscoe is served by Roscoe Collegiate Independent School District. The recent wind development in the area has enabled Roscoe ISD to update its aging facilities built in the era of the Works Progress Administration. Since the 2012–13 school year, all of the district's students have been in new or updated buildings. Roscoe Collegiate ISD operates one of 50 Early College High Schools in Texas in partnership with Western Texas College in Snyder. Students of Roscoe Collegiate High School have the ability to earn an associate degree from Western Texas College at the time of high school graduation. The mascot of Roscoe Collegiate High School is the Plowboys.

Transportation
In addition to the Union Pacific, another rail line, the Roscoe, Snyder and Pacific Railway (RS&P), formerly extended  from Roscoe to Fluvanna, passing through Snyder. Built in 1908, the railway served as a bridge between the Atchison, Topeka and Santa Fe Railway in Snyder and the then-Texas and Pacific Railway in Roscoe. Although the RS&P became one of the most profitable short lines in the nation during its early years, passenger service was discontinued in 1953, freight service was discontinued in the late 1970s, and most of the tracks outside of the city had been removed by 1984.

Arts and culture
Roscoe is home to the Plowboy Mudbog which is held twice a year, during the Independence Day Celebration, which is held on July 4 weekend, and in October, usually coinciding with the Wind Festival. The July mudbog normally draws around 70 to 80 trucks competing for prize and bragging rights.

Notable people

J. J. Pickle, U.S. congressman

See also

Double Mountain Fork Brazos River
Hobbs, Texas
Brazos Wind Farm
Wind power in Texas
U.S. Route 84

References

External links
City of Roscoe website

Photos of West Texas and Llano Estacado

Cities in Nolan County, Texas
Cities in Texas